Galium rubioides (European bedstraw) is a species of plants in the family Rubiaceae, native to Europe and Asia. Natural distribution is from Austria and Croatia east to Russia and Turkey, plus the Caucasus, Western Siberia, Kazakhstan, northern China (Hebei, Heilongjiang, Henan, Jilin, Liaoning, Xinjiang) and the Amur region of Russia. The species is also reportedly naturalized in Northampton County, Pennsylvania.

Galium rubioides is an erect herb up to 100 cm tall, with broad leaves up to 20 cm long and 15 cm wide, generally in whorls of 4. Fruits and roots have a reddish tinge.

References

External links
 
Photo of herbarium specimen, type of Galium rubioides 
Info Flora, Das Nationale Daten- und Informationszentrum der Schweizer Flora, Galium rubioides
Forum Acta Plantarum, Archivo floristico (with many nice photos)
Botanische Spaziergaenge, Bilder von Österreichs Flora
Plantarium Russia, Описание таксона Galium rubioides 
Molbiol Подмаренник мареновидный (Galium rubioides, Rubiaceae)

rubioides
Flora of Xinjiang
Flora of Liaoning
Flora of Jilin
Flora of Henan
Flora of Heilongjiang
Flora of Hebei
Flora of Kazakhstan
Flora of Azerbaijan
Flora of Armenia
Flora of Siberia
Flora of Ukraine
Flora of Russia
Flora of Poland
Flora of Belarus
Flora of Serbia
Flora of Croatia
Flora of the Czech Republic
Flora of Hungary
Flora of Austria
Flora of China
Plants described in 1753
Taxa named by Carl Linnaeus